The 1976 ABA All Star Game was the ninth and final American Basketball Association All-Star Game, played at McNichols Arena in Denver, Colorado on January 27, 1976. This time, the league abandoned the usual East vs. West format it used from the 1967-68 season onward and instead had the league's first place team at the All Star break face off against a team of ABA All Stars.  At the All Star break the Denver Nuggets were in first place, which was convenient as the Nuggets had also been selected to host the game in McNichols Arena. Kevin Loughery of the New York Nets coached the All-Stars while Larry Brown led the Denver Nuggets. This was the second year in a row that Loughery and Brown coached against each other in the ABA All-Star Game. (The Nuggets went on to finish the regular season in first place at 60-24 (.714), but after beating the Kentucky Colonels 4 games to 3 in the ABA Semifinals the Nuggets lost in the 1976 ABA Finals to the New York Nets, 4 games to 2.)

Pre-game entertainment was provided by Glen Campbell and Charlie Rich.

Halftime of the All Star Game saw the first-ever Slam Dunk Contest, which was won by Julius Erving of the New York Nets (who took off from the free throw line for one of his dunks) over David Thompson of the Denver Nuggets, Artis Gilmore of the Kentucky Colonels, George Gervin of the San Antonio Spurs and Larry Kenon of the Spurs.  The NBA later adopted the Slam Dunk Contest as part of its All Star Game starting in 1984 (also hosted by the Denver Nuggets). 
Denver's 52 fourth quarter points was a record for an ABA All Star Game and capped a ferocious comeback win. David Thompson of the Denver Nuggets was named MVP.

This was the final ABA All Star Game, due to the ABA-NBA merger in June 1976.

All-Stars

Denver
 
 
Halftime — All-Stars, 56-55
Third Quarter — All-Stars, 97-92
Officials: Norm Drucker and Ed Middleton
Attendance: 17,798.

References

External links 

1975–76 ABA season
Denver Nuggets games
ABA All-Star Games
1975 in sports in Colorado
January 1975 sports events in the United States